Bobby Vinton is Bobby Vinton's thirty-fourth album, released in 1988. Re-recordings of previous hits include "Sealed With a Kiss", "Blue on Blue", "Blue Velvet" and "My Melody of Love".

Track listing

Side 1
 "Sealed With a Kiss" - (Peter Udell, Gary Geld) - 3:46
 "Blue on Blue" - (Hal David, Burt Bacharach) - 3:03
 "When I Was Seventeen" - (Bobby Vinton, Gene Allen) - 3:45
 "I've Always Loved You" - (Bobby Vinton, Gene Allen) - 3:39
 "Proud to Be an American" - (Bobby Vinton, Johnny Prill) - 3:58

Side 2
 "The Last Rose" - (Coweta F. House) - 3:16
 "I Go to Pieces" - (Del Shannon) - 2:47
 "This Time I Know It's Real" - (Norman Sallitt) - 3:47
 "Blue Velvet" - (Bernie Wayne, Lee Morris) - 2:47
 "My Melody of Love" - (Bobby Vinton, Henry Mayer, George Buschor) - 3:08

Album credits
Tracks 1 - 5 and 8 produced by Bobby Vinton and Tom Kubis
Tracks 6 produced by Michael Lloyd for Mike Curb Productions and Pete Drake
Track 7 produced by Mike Levitz, Mike Murphy and Howie Horowitz
Track 9 and 10 produced by Bob Morgan

1988 albums
Bobby Vinton albums
Albums produced by Michael Lloyd (music producer)
Curb Records albums